Cookie jars are utilitarian or decorative ceramic or glass jars often found in American and Canadian kitchens. In the United Kingdom, they are known as biscuit barrels or biscuit jars. If they are cans made out of tinplate, they are called biscuit tins. While used to store actual cookies or biscuits, they are sometimes employed to store other edible items like candy or dog treats, or non-edible items like currency (in the manner of a piggy bank).

Origin and history

Cookie jars, also known as biscuit barrels or jars, have been used in England since the latter part of the 18th century. They were often made of glass with metal lids. Cookie jars became popular in America around the time of the Great Depression in 1929. Early American cookie jars were made of glass with metal screw-on lids. In the 1930s, stoneware became predominant as the material for American cookie jars. Early cookie jars typically have simple cylindrical shapes and were often painted with floral or leaf decorations or emblazoned with colorful decals.

The Brush Pottery Company of Zanesville, Ohio is generally recognized as producing the first ceramic cookie jar. The jar was green with the word "Cookies" embossed on the front. Most cookie jar manufacturers followed Brush's move to ceramics in the late 1930s, and designs became more innovative with figures, fruits, vegetables, animals, and other whimsical interpretations such as the Hull "Little Red Riding Hood" predominating. The golden period for American cookie jar production covers the years from 1940 until 1970, with several manufacturers rising to prominence.

American themes

 Advertising (Coca-Cola, Kellogg's)
 Character (mammy, clown)
 Funny animals (rabbit in hat, pink poodle)
 Nursery rhyme/storybook (Cinderella, Red Riding Hood)
 Holidays and seasons (Christmas, Jack o' Lantern, snowman)
 Cultural icons (Elvis, Superman, I Love Lucy, Cookie Monster)
 Everyday objects (house, truck, butter churn)

Andy Warhol
Artist Andy Warhol amassed a collection of 175 ceramic cookie jars. These were in a multitude of shapes and figures. Most were purchased at flea markets. Warhol's collection was featured in a prominent news magazine and sparked an interest in collecting cookie jars. When asked in the 1970s why he pursued the 1930s and 1940s jars, Warhol said simply, "They are time pieces." At an auction of his apartment's contents in 1987, Warhol's collection of cookie jars realized $250,000.

Other uses
Sometimes the phrase "keep your hands out of the cookie jar" is a way of telling someone to stay out of other people's business, even when doing so seems lucrative.
In financial reporting, "cookie jar accounting" is the practice of increasing reserves during good years and eating them up during bad years. This process of income smoothing is totally ethical, but non-disclosure - especially to consistently reach performance targets - is illegal.
In computer programming, a "cookie jar" is an area of memory set aside for storing cookies.

Popular culture
"Who Stole the Cookie from the Cookie Jar?" is an elementary school song.
The American band Gym Class Heroes wrote a song called "Cookie Jar" which was released as a single in 2008.
Jack Johnson (musician) wrote a song called "Cookie Jar" which was released on the album On and On (2003)
South Korean girl group Red Velvet released their debut Japanese EP titled #Cookie Jar in 2017 along with its lead single of the same name.

Gallery

References

External links
 
 Warhol's World on View: Gems to Cookie Jars
 Collector Found His Passion In Cookie Jars  Video produced by Wisconsin Public Television

Collecting
Food storage containers
Serving and dining
Money containers